Nord is a census-designated place in Butte County, California. Its zip code is 95973 and its area code is 530.  It lies at an elevation of 151 feet (46 m). Nord's population was 320 at the 2010 census.

History
A post office operated at Nord from 1871 to 1933, with an interruption from 1919 to 1920.

Demographics
At the 2010 census Nord had a population of 320. The racial makeup of Nord was 233 (72.8%) White, 1 (0.3%) African American, 6 (1.9%) Native American, 16 (5.0%) Asian, 0 (0.0%) Pacific Islander, 48 (15.0%) from other races, and 16 (5.0%) from two or more races. Hispanic or Latino of any race were 122 people (38.1%).

The whole population lived in households, no one lived in non-institutionalized group quarters and no one was institutionalized.

There were 104 households, 42 (40.4%) had children under the age of 18 living in them, 65 (62.5%) were opposite-sex married couples living together, 5 (4.8%) had a female householder with no husband present, 6 (5.8%) had a male householder with no wife present.  There were 7 (6.7%) unmarried opposite-sex partnerships, and 1 (1.0%) same-sex married couples or partnerships. 19 households (18.3%) were one person and 7 (6.7%) had someone living alone who was 65 or older. The average household size was 3.08.  There were 76 families (73.1% of households); the average family size was 3.61.

The age distribution was 83 people (25.9%) under the age of 18, 33 people (10.3%) aged 18 to 24, 79 people (24.7%) aged 25 to 44, 99 people (30.9%) aged 45 to 64, and 26 people (8.1%) who were 65 or older.  The median age was 36.5 years. For every 100 females, there were 117.7 males.  For every 100 females age 18 and over, there were 115.5 males.

There were 108 housing units at an average density of ,of which 104 were occupied, 81 (77.9%) by the owners and 23 (22.1%) by renters.  The homeowner vacancy rate was 0%; the rental vacancy rate was 4.2%.  247 people (77.2% of the population) lived in owner-occupied housing units and 73 people (22.8%) lived in rental housing units.

Government

County

State 

Federal

References

Census-designated places in Butte County, California
Census-designated places in California